Bally Sports Arizona (BSAZ) is an American regional sports network owned by Diamond Sports Group, a joint venture between Sinclair Broadcast Group and Entertainment Studios, and operates as an affiliate of Bally Sports. The channel broadcasts professional, collegiate and high school sports events, with a primary focus on Phoenix area teams. It is available on most cable providers throughout Arizona; Bally Sports Arizona is also available nationwide on satellite provider DirecTV.

Overview
On March 21, 1996, two new expansion teams, the Arizona Diamondbacks of Major League Baseball and an unnamed National Hockey League franchise from Phoenix (to become known as the Arizona Coyotes) announced 10 year deals with Fox/Liberty Sports. The partnership between News Corporation and Liberty Media had been formed several months earlier. The name for the new network was would have been Prime Sports Arizona, but following the announcement to rebrand Liberty's Prime Sports Networks and form Fox Sports Net, the name was changed to Fox Sports Arizona (FSAZ). The network would be the first to use the new Fox Sports name.

Fox Sports Arizona was launched on September 7, 1996, with the first game on the network being Arizona State University's 45–42 win over Washington University. The first Coyotes game was broadcast on October 18 and the Diamondbacks would finally join the network a year and a half later for their inaugural 1998 season. The Diamondbacks' first appearance would be a spring training game on February 27, 1998. The network also was the first to televise high school football and basketball state championships. In 2003, Fox Sports Arizona acquired rights to the Phoenix Suns which had been televised by Cox Communications on its sports network since 1981.

On December 14, 2017, as part of a merger between both companies, The Walt Disney Company announced plans to acquire all 22 regional Fox Sports networks from 21st Century Fox, including Fox Sports Arizona. However, on June 27, 2018, the Justice Department ordered their divestment under antitrust grounds, citing Disney's ownership of ESPN. On May 3, 2019, Sinclair Broadcast Group and Entertainment Studios (through their joint venture, Diamond Holdings) bought Fox Sports Networks from The Walt Disney Company for $10.6 billion. The deal closed on August 22, 2019. On November 17, 2020, Sinclair announced an agreement with casino operator Bally's Corporation to serve as a new naming rights partner for the FSN channels. Sinclair announced the new Bally Sports branding for the channels on January 27, 2021.  On March 31, 2021, coinciding with the start of the 2021 Major League Baseball season, Fox Sports Arizona was rebranded as Bally Sports Arizona, resulting in 18 other Regional Sports Networks renamed Bally Sports in their respective regions.

Bally Sports Arizona holds the regional cable television rights to three of the four major professional sports franchises in the Phoenix area: the Arizona Diamondbacks (Major League Baseball, with rights to most regular season games), the Phoenix Suns (NBA, with rights to most regular season and early-round playoff games) and the Arizona Coyotes (NHL, also with rights to most regular season and early-round playoff games), as well as the Phoenix Mercury (WNBA). Also, they carry matches for the Phoenix Rising FC of USL Championship and games for the Tucson Roadrunners of the American Hockey League (which are also streamed live on AHL.TV).  In addition, Bally Sports Arizona also televises collegiate sports events involving the Arizona State Sun Devils, as well as a number of events from other teams of the Pac-12 Conference.

Fox Sports Arizona formerly held the broadcast rights to select Arizona Wildcats sporting events from its inception until the spring of 2009; the University of Arizona shifted these event telecasts to the Arizona Wildcats Sports Network, beginning in August 2009, which were simulcast on FSA from 2010 until 2012, upon the launch of the Pac-12 Network and its dedicated "Pac-12 Arizona" subfeed network devoted to Arizona and Arizona State University sports.

Other services

Bally Sports Arizona Extra
Fox Sports Arizona launched an alternate feed, Fox Sports Arizona Plus, on April 25, 2008. Created as an overflow active only during instances in which a sporting event that Fox Sports Arizona holds rights to overlaps with another game being broadcast on the primary channel, it was established to resolve scheduling conflicts involving the 2008 NBA Playoffs Game 3 matchup between Phoenix Suns and a scheduled Arizona Diamondbacks game on that date. Now branded as Bally Sports Arizona Extra, it's available on many cable providers.

The Bally Sports Arizona Extra brand name was first in use on an additional overflow channel that was used for at least three Diamondbacks games.

In the Southern Arizona region only, including Tucson, Bally Sports Arizona Extra airs San Diego Padres games and related programming produced by its sister-network Bally Sports San Diego to select cable providers in that region.  That region would thereby be blacked out from both Padres and Diamondbacks games on MLB.TV and MLB Extra Innings due to territory rights.

On March 14, 2023, Diamond Sports filed for Chapter 11 bankruptcy.

On-air staff
 Steve Berthiaume – Diamondbacks play-by-play announcer
 Rich Waltz – Diamondbacks fill-in play-by-play announcer
 Greg Schulte – Diamondbacks fill-in play-by-play announcer
 Bob Brenly – Diamondbacks color commentator
 Luis Gonzalez – Diamondbacks backup color commentator
 Tom Candiotti – Diamondbacks backup color commentator
 Jody Jackson – Diamondbacks and Coyotes studio host and Diamondbacks field reporter
 Kate Longworth – Diamondbacks field reporter
 Todd Walsh – Diamondbacks and Coyotes studio host
 Joe Borowski – Diamondbacks studio analyst
 Brandon Webb – Diamondbacks studio analyst
 Kevin Ray – Suns play-by-play announcer
 Eddie Johnson – Suns color commentator
 Ann Meyers – Suns color commentator
 Tom Leander – Suns backup play-by-play and studio host
 Tom Chambers – Suns studio analyst
 Matt McConnell – Coyotes play-by-play announcer
 Tyson Nash – Coyotes color analyst
 Paul Bissonnette – Coyotes studio analyst

References

External links
 

Bally Sports
Fox Sports Networks
Arizona Wildcats
Television channels and stations established in 1996
Companies that filed for Chapter 11 bankruptcy in 2023
1996 establishments in Arizona